That's Entertainment! is a 1974 American compilation film released by Metro-Goldwyn-Mayer to celebrate the studio's  50th anniversary. The success of the retrospective prompted a 1976 sequel, the related 1985 film That's Dancing!, and a third installment in 1994.

Compiled by its writer-producer-director, Jack Haley Jr., under the supervision of executive producer Daniel Melnick, the film turned the spotlight on MGM's legacy of musical films from the 1920s through the 1950s, culling dozens of performances from the studio's movies, and featuring archive footage of Judy Garland, Eleanor Powell, Lena Horne, Esther Williams, Ann Miller, Kathryn Grayson, Howard Keel, Jeanette MacDonald, Cyd Charisse, June Allyson, Clark Gable, Mario Lanza, William Warfield, and many others.

Various segments were hosted by a succession of the studio's legendary stars: Frank Sinatra, Gene Kelly, Fred Astaire, Peter Lawford, Debbie Reynolds, Bing Crosby, James Stewart, Elizabeth Taylor, Mickey Rooney, Donald O'Connor, and Liza Minnelli, representing her mother Judy Garland.

The host segments for That's Entertainment! constitute some of the final footage to be captured on the famous MGM backlot, which appears ramshackle and rundown in 1973, because MGM had sold the property to developers and the sets were about to be demolished. Several of the hosts, including Bing Crosby, remark on the crumbling conditions during their segments; the most notable degradation can be seen when Fred Astaire revisits the ruins of a train station set that had been used in the opening of The Band Wagon two decades earlier, and when Peter Lawford revisits exteriors used in his 1947 musical Good News.

The title of the film derives from the anthemic song "That's Entertainment!", by Arthur Schwartz and Howard Dietz, introduced in the 1953 MGM musical The Band Wagon. The film title is usually expressed with an exclamation mark, but in some contexts the punctuation is dropped, as in the movie poster.

Dedication

Musical numbers 
Unless otherwise noted, information is taken from IMDb's soundtrack section for this movie.

 "Singin' in the Rain" Prologue - 
 sung by Cliff Edwards with dancing by Chorus Line; from The Hollywood Revue of 1929 (1929)
 sung by Jimmy Durante; from  Speak Easily (1932)
 Judy Garland; from Little Nellie Kelly (1940)
 the main title sequence from Singin' in the Rain (1952) sung by Gene Kelly, Debbie Reynolds, Donald O'Connor
 "The Broadway Melody" - Charles King and Chorus Girls; from The Broadway Melody (1929)
 "Rosalie" - sung by Chorus with dancing by Eleanor Powell; from Rosalie (1937)
 "Indian Love Call" - sung by Nelson Eddy and Jeanette MacDonald; from Rose-Marie (1936)
 "A Pretty Girl Is Like a Melody" - from The Great Ziegfeld (1936)
 sung by Allan Jones (Lip-synced by Dennis Morgan) and Ziegfeld Girls 
 "Begin the Beguine" - dancing by Fred Astaire and Eleanor Powell; from Broadway Melody of 1940 (1940)
 "The Song's Gotta Come from the Heart" - danced and sung by Frank Sinatra and Jimmy Durante; from It Happened in Brooklyn (1947)
 "The Melody of Spring" - sung by Elizabeth Taylor; from Cynthia (1947)
 "Honeysuckle Rose" - Lena Horne; from Thousands Cheer (1943)
 "Take Me Out to the Ball Game" - Gene Kelly and Frank Sinatra; from Take Me Out to the Ball Game (1949)
 "Thou Swell" - June Allyson with Pete Roberts and Eugene Cox (Lip-synced by Ramon Blackburn and Royce Blackburn); from Words and Music (1948)
 "The Varsity Drag" - dancing by June Allyson, Peter Lawford, and Chorus Line; from Good News (1947)
 "Aba Daba Honeymoon" - (sung by) Debbie Reynolds and Carleton Carpenter; from Two Weeks with Love (1950)
 "It's a Most Unusual Day" - from A Date with Judy (1948)
 sung by Jean McLaren (Lip-synced by Elizabeth Taylor)
 sung by Jane Powell with Wallace Beery, Scotty Beckett, George Cleveland, Leon Ames, Carmen Miranda, Selena Royle, Robert Stack, Elizabeth Taylor and Jerry Hunter featuring the Xavier Cugat Orchestra
 "On the Atchison, Topeka and the Santa Fe" - Ray Bolger, Judy Garland, Marjorie Main, Ben Carter, Virginia O'Brien, Cyd Charisse, and Ensemble; from The Harvey Girls (1946)
 "It Must Be You" - dancing by a dance chorus; sung by Robert Montgomery and Lottice Howell; from Free and Easy (1930)
 "Got a Feelin' for You" - dancing by Joan Crawford; sung by Joan Crawford and Chorus (introduced by Conrad Nagel); from The Hollywood Revue of 1929 (1929)
 "Reckless" - dancing by Jean Harlow, Rafael Alcayde, and Chorus; sung by Virginia Verrill (lip-synced by Jean Harlow) from Reckless (1935)
 "Did I Remember" - sung by Virginia Verrill (lip-synced by Jean Harlow) and Cary Grant from Suzy (1936)
 "Easy to Love" - sung by Marjorie Lane (lip-synced by Eleanor Powell) and James Stewart; from Born to Dance (1936)
 "Puttin' on the Ritz" - Clark Gable and Ensemble; from Idiot's Delight (1939)
 "Dear Mr. Gable (You Made Me Love You)" - Judy Garland from Broadway Melody of 1938 (1937)
 "Babes in Arms" - Mickey Rooney, Judy Garland, Douglas McPhail, Betty Jaynes, and Chorus; from Babes in Arms (1939)
 "Hoe Down" - dancing by Mickey Rooney, Judy Garland, and Ensemble; from Babes on Broadway (1941)
 "Do the La Conga" - MGM Studio Orchestra; from Strike Up the Band (1940)
 "Waitin' for the Robert E. Lee" - dancing by Chorus; sung by Mickey Rooney and Judy Garland
 "Babes On Broadway" - dancing by Mickey Rooney and Judy Garland; sung by Mickey Rooney, Judy Garland, Virginia Weidler, and Richard Quine; from Babes on Broadway (1941)
 "Strike Up the Band" - sung by Mickey Rooney, Judy Garland, and Chorus; from Strike Up the Band (1940)
 "The Babbitt and the Bromide" - dancing by Gene Kelly and Fred Astaire; from Ziegfeld Follies (1946)
 "They Can't Take That Away from Me" - dancing by Fred Astaire and Ginger Rogers; sung by Fred Astaire; from The Barkleys of Broadway (1949)
 "Heigh Ho the Gang's All Here" and "Let’s Go Bavarian" - danced and sung by Fred Astaire, Joan Crawford, and Chorus; from Dancing Lady (1933)
 "I Guess I'll Have to Change My Plan" - danced and sung by Fred Astaire and Jack Buchanan; from The Band Wagon (1953)
 "Sunday Jumps" - dancing by Fred Astaire; from Royal Wedding (1951)
 "Shoes with Wings On" - dancing by Fred Astaire; from The Barkleys of Broadway (1949)
 "You're All the World to Me" - danced by Fred Astaire; from Royal Wedding (1951)
 "Dancing in the Dark" - dancing by Fred Astaire and Cyd Charisse; from The Band Wagon (1953)
 Esther Williams Montage: 
 "Pagan Love Song" - sung by Chorus; from Pagan Love Song (1950)
 "You and You" (aka "Du und Du, Op. 367") - from Bathing Beauty (1944)
 "Viennese Blood" (aka "Wiener Blut, Op. 354")
 also includes water ballets from Million Dollar Mermaid (1952)
 "I Wanna Be Loved by You" - sung by Helen Kane (lip-synced by Debbie Reynolds) and Carleton Carpenter; from Three Little Words (1950)
 "I Gotta Hear That Beat" - danced and sung by Ann Miller; from Small Town Girl (1953)
 "Be My Love" - sung by Kathryn Grayson and Mario Lanza; from  The Toast of New Orleans (1950)
 "Make 'Em Laugh" - sung by Donald O'Connor; from Singin' in the Rain (1952)
 "Cotton Blossom" - sung by Chorus 
 "Make Believe" - sung by Kathryn Grayson and Howard Keel
 "Ol' Man River" - sung by William Warfield and Chorus; from Show Boat (1951)
 "By Myself" - Fred Astaire from The Band Wagon (1953)
 "Be a Clown" - dancing by Gene Kelly & The Nicholas Brothers; sung by Gene Kelly; from The Pirate (1948)
 "The Children's Dance" - Gene Kelly; from Living in a Big Way (1947)
 "The Pirate Ballet" - dancing by Gene Kelly; from The Pirate (1948)
 "La Cumparsita" - Gene Kelly; in Anchors Aweigh (1945)
 "New York, New York" - danced and sung by Gene Kelly, Frank Sinatra, and Jules Munshin; from On the Town (1949)
 "The Worry Song" - dancing by Gene Kelly and Jerry Mouse; sung by Gene Kelly & Sara Berner; from Anchors Aweigh (1945)
 "Broadway Melody Ballet" - Gene Kelly and Ensemble; from Singin' in the Rain (1952)
 "In the Good Old Summertime" - sung by Chorus; from In the Good Old Summertime (1949)
 "La Cucaracha" - The Garland Sisters; from La Fiesta de Santa Barbara (1935)
 "Waltz with a Swing" - Judy Garland
 "Americana" - Judy Garland and Deanna Durbin; from Every Sunday (1936)
 "Your Broadway and My Broadway" - dancing Judy Garland, Buddy Ebsen, Eleanor Powell, and George Murphy; from Broadway Melody of 1938 (1937)
 "You're Off to See the Wizard" - The Munchkins
 "If I Only Had the Nerve" - Judy Garland, Bert Lahr, Ray Bolger, Jack Haley and Buddy Ebsen
 "We're Off to See the Wizard" - Judy Garland, Bert Lahr, Ray Bolger and Jack Haley and Buddy Ebsen
 "Over the Rainbow" - Judy Garland; from The Wizard of Oz (1939)
 "But Not for Me" - Judy Garland from Girl Crazy (1943)
 "The Trolley Song" - sung by Judy Garland and Chorus 
 "Under the Bamboo Tree" - danced and sung by Judy Garland and Margaret O'Brien
 "The Boy Next Door" - sung by Judy Garland; from Meet Me in St. Louis (1944)
 "Get Happy" - Judy Garland & Chorus; from Summer Stock (1950)
 "Going Hollywood" - Bing Crosby and Ensemble; from Going Hollywood (1933)
 "Well, Did You Evah" - Bing Crosby and Frank Sinatra
 "True Love" - Bing Crosby and Grace Kelly; from High Society (1956)
 "Hallelujah" - sung by Kay Armen, Ann Miller, Jane Powell, Debbie Reynolds, Vic Damone, Russ Tamblyn, Tony Martin, and Chorus; from Hit the Deck (1955)
 "Barnraising Dance (Bless Your Beautiful Hide)" - dancing by various characters; from Seven Brides for Seven Brothers (1954)
 "Gigi" - sung by Louis Jourdan
 "Thank Heaven for Little Girls" - sung by Maurice Chevalier and Chorus; from Gigi (1958)
 "An American in Paris Ballet" - dancing by Gene Kelly, Leslie Caron, and Ensemble; from An American in Paris (1951)

Charts 
The soundtrack was released by MGM (2624012).

Appearances 
Unless otherwise noted, information is based on IMDb's full cast section.

 June Allyson
 Leon Ames
 Kay Armen
 Edward Arnold (uncredited)
 Fred Astaire 
 Ethel Barrymore (uncredited)
 Lionel Barrymore (uncredited)
 Scotty Beckett
 Wallace Beery (uncredited)
 Ray Bolger
 Joe E. Brown
 Virginia Bruce
 Jack Buchanan
 Billie Burke
 Leslie Caron
 Carleton Carpenter
 Cyd Charisse
 George Cleveland
 Maurice Chevalier
 Joan Crawford
 Bing Crosby 
 Xavier Cugat
 Jacques d'Amboise
 Arlene Dahl (uncredited)
 Virginia Dale
 Lili Damita (uncredited)
 Vic Damone
 Gloria DeHaven (uncredited)
 Tom Drake
 Jimmy Durante
 Deanna Durbin
 Buddy Ebsen
 Nelson Eddy
 Cliff Edwards
 Vera-Ellen
 Errol Flynn (uncredited)
 Clark Gable
 Greta Garbo
 Ava Gardner
 Judy Garland
 Betty Garrett (uncredited)
 Greer Garson (uncredited)
 Hermione Gingold (uncredited)
 Cary Grant
 Kathryn Grayson
 Virginia Grey
 Jack Haley
 Jean Harlow
 Bernadene Hayes
 Van Heflin (uncredited)
 Katharine Hepburn (uncredited)
 Lena Horne
 Lottice Howell
 Claude Jarman Jr. (uncredited)
 Betty Jaynes
 Van Johnson
 Allan Jones
 Jennifer Jones (uncredited)
 Louis Jourdan
 Buster Keaton (uncredited)
 Howard Keel
 Gene Kelly 
 Charles King
 Lorraine Krueger
 Bert Lahr
 Fernando Lamas
 Angela Lansbury (uncredited)
 Mario Lanza
 Peter Lawford
 Ruta Lee
 Vivien Leigh
 Jeanette MacDonald
 Marjorie Main
 Joan Marsh
 Tony Martin
 Douglas McPhail
 Ann Miller
 Sidney Miller
 Liza Minnelli
 Carmen Miranda (uncredited)
 Ricardo Montalbán
 Robert Montgomery
 Agnes Moorehead (uncredited)
 Natalie Moorhead
 Dennis Morgan
 Frank Morgan (uncredited)
 Jules Munshin
 Conrad Nagel (uncredited)
 J. Carrol Naish (uncredited)
 Julie Newmar
 The Nicholas Brothers
 Margaret O'Brien
 Virginia O'Brien
 Donald O'Connor
 Reginald Owen (uncredited)
 Walter Pidgeon (uncredited)
 Marc Platt
 Paul Porcasi
 Eleanor Powell
 Jane Powell
 June Preisser
 Richard Quine
 Tommy Rall
 Debbie Reynolds
 Jeff Richards
 Ginger Rogers
 Mickey Rooney
 Selena Royle (uncredited)
 Norma Shearer (uncredited)
 Frank Sinatra
 Red Skelton (uncredited)
 Robert Stack
 James Stewart
 Paula Stone
 Russ Tamblyn
 Elizabeth Taylor
 Sidney Toler (uncredited)
 Audrey Totter (uncredited)
 Spencer Tracy (uncredited)
 Lana Turner
 William Warfield
 Virginia Weidler
 Esther Williams
 Robert Young (uncredited)

 Notes
 Clips of Howard Keel (as Hazard Endicott) are from the 1950 film Pagan Love Song.
 Clips of Agnes Moorehead (as Parthy Hawks) are from the 1951 film Show Boat.

Release 
The film premiered at the Loew's Beverly Theater in Beverly Hills on the evening of May 17, 1974. MGM billed it as their greatest premiere in a quarter century. There was a red carpet from the Loew's Beverly Theater to the Beverly Wilshire Hotel for the post-screening dinner and dancing. Also promoted were the 100 movie stars in attendance. Anyone paying $100 per seat for the dinner could sit at a table with a movie star. The premiere also featured several live introductions to the various on-screen segments; it was co-hosted by Sammy Davis Jr. and Liza Minnelli and featured live stage appearances by Debbie Reynolds, Frank Sinatra, Gene Kelly, Elizabeth Taylor, and others. The premiere, as an event and a party, was a dazzling success. However, as a publicity event for MGM, it was completely overshadowed; the expected press were all across town covering the breaking news of the Symbionese Liberation Army shootout that night. The film had its New York premiere on May 23 and opened the following day at the Ziegfeld Theatre. The film opened nationwide in June 1974.

Reception 
The film grossed $25,600 in its first week in Los Angeles and did even better the following week with $45,000. Over the 4-day Memorial Day weekend at the Ziegfeld it grossed $71,164. The film was United Artists' highest-grossing film of the year. Adjusted for inflation, the film has grossed $19.1 million worldwide.

Sequels 
Despite statements made in the original theatrical trailer and promotional materials that such a production would never be repeated, That's Entertainment! is one of the few documentaries to spawn official sequels.

That's Entertainment, Part II was released in 1976. The use of myriad hosts was dropped for this production, instead Fred Astaire and Gene Kelly partnered to co-host the retrospective, which expanded beyond musicals to pay tribute to dramatic and comedy stars as well. The sequel would turn out to be the last time Astaire and Kelly danced together on film.

That's Dancing! was released in 1985. Unlike the two prior That's Entertainment! films, this documentary was not limited exclusively to MGM productions. The film is closely related to the That's Entertainment! series, with shared studio and producers credits, but also since its opening credits contain a card with the title That's Entertainment! III (not to be confused with the subsequent 1994 film).

That's Entertainment! III was released in 1994.  The film featured more archival footage, with a distinct focus on previously unreleased (or rarely seen) material cut from the MGM films.

Gene Kelly is the only individual to host in all four films.

Home media 
All three That's Entertainment! films were released to DVD in 2004. The box set collection of the films included a bonus DVD that included additional musical numbers that had been cut from MGM films as well as the first release of the complete performance of "Mr. Monotony" by Judy Garland (the version used in That's Entertainment! III is truncated). That's Dancing! received a separate DVD release in 2007. The MGM trilogy also received a Blu-ray release in the late 2000s; the bonus content of the DVD box set was spread among the three films rather than presented as a standalone disc. In January 2023, the film was added to MGM+ to celebrate the network and streaming platform's rebranding from Epix; Judy Garland's recording of the titular song would also serve as the music for the rebrand's promotional trailer released at that time concurrently.

See also 
 List of American films of 1974

References

External links 
 
 
 
 

1974 films
1974 documentary films
1970s musical films
American documentary films
American musical films
Documentary films about films
Metro-Goldwyn-Mayer films
Films directed by Jack Haley Jr.
Documentary films about Hollywood, Los Angeles
Compilation films
Golden jubilees
1970s English-language films
1970s American films